The 2017 San Francisco 49ers season was the franchise's 68th season in the National Football League and their 72nd overall. It was also the first season under the head coach/general manager tandem of Kyle Shanahan and John Lynch. After a 0–9 start, they won 6 of their last 7 games and finished the season 6–10, improving from their last two season records. Despite this, the 49ers were eliminated from playoff contention in Week 12.

The 49ers season largely turned around after they acquired quarterback Jimmy Garoppolo from the New England Patriots on October 30, 2017. At this point, the 49ers had a record of 0–8, dead last in the NFC. Garoppolo made his first start during Week 13 against the Chicago Bears and led them to a 15–14 win. Garoppolo won the final five games of the season for the 49ers, bringing the regular-season record to 6–10, the most wins by the team since the 2014 season. During the 5-game win streak, the 49ers won 3 straight games over teams that eventually made the playoffs (Weeks 15–17 against the Titans, Jaguars, and Rams). From Weeks 1–12, the 49ers scored just 187 points (17 points per game), which was in the bottom half of the league. During the 5-game win streak, the 49ers offense scored 144 points (28.8 points per game). The highlight of the year was during Week 16, the 49ers scored 44 points against the Jacksonville Jaguars, who had the NFL's top scoring defense at the time,  allowing just 14.9 points per game. The 49ers finished the season by being the only team in the NFL to go undefeated in the month of December. The 49ers also became the first team in NFL history to start a season 0–9 and finish with more than three wins.

Offseason

Coaching changes
Owner Jed York announced that he would hire a new general manager and the new head coach due to a bad season. On January 29, 2017, the 49ers hired John Lynch as their general manager. On February 6, 2017, the 49ers hired Atlanta Falcons' offensive coordinator Kyle Shanahan as the new coach of the San Francisco 49ers.

Roster changes

Free agency
The 49ers entered free agency with the following:

Signings

Departures

Draft

Notes
 The 49ers acquired an additional sixth-round selection as part of a trade that sent their 2016 seventh-round selection and Vernon Davis to the Denver Broncos.
 The 49ers acquired an additional seventh-round selection as part of a trade that sent Andy Lee to the Cleveland Browns.
 The 49ers traded their sixth-round selection (Nos. 186 overall) to the Baltimore Ravens in exchange for their sixth-round selection (Nos. 198 overall) and C Jeremy Zuttah.
 The 49ers acquired an additional fifth-round selection as part of a trade that sent their Derek Carrier to the Washington Redskins in 2015, but sent a seventh-round selection back due to Carrier's performance.
 The 49ers traded their first-round selection (Nos. 2 overall) to the Chicago Bears in exchange for their third- and fourth-round selection (Nos. 67 and 111 overall) and 2018 third-round selections.
 The 49ers traded their second- and fourth-round selection (Nos. 34 and 111 overall) to the Seattle Seahawks in exchange for their first-round selection (Nos. 31 overall).
 The 49ers traded their third-round selection (Nos. 67 overall) to the New Orleans Saints in exchange for their seventh-round selection (Nos. 229 overall) and 2018 second-round selections.
 The 49ers traded their fourth- and seventh-round selection (Nos. 109 and 219 overall) to the Minnesota Vikings in exchange for their third-round selection (Nos. 104 overall).
 The 49ers traded their 2018 fourth-round selections to the Denver Broncos in exchange for their fifth-round selections (Nos. 177 overall) and RB Kapri Bibbs.
 The 49ers traded their fourth- and fifth-round selection (Nos. 143 and 161 overall) to the Indianapolis Colts in exchange for their fourth-round selection (Nos. 121 overall).

Undrafted free agents

Staff

Final roster

Preseason

Regular season

Schedule

Game summaries

Week 1: vs. Carolina Panthers

Week 2: at Seattle Seahawks

Week 3: vs. Los Angeles Rams

After losing to the Seahawks on the road, the 49ers went home to take on the Rams on Thursday Night Football.  In the first quarter, the Rams scored first when Todd Gurley ran for a 3-yard touchdown to make it 7–0.  The Niners managed to tie it up when Brian Hoyer ran for a 9-yard touchdown to make it 7-7.  The Rams moved back into the lead when Jared Goff found Gurley on a 7-yard pass to make it 14–7.  In the second quarter, the Rams increased their lead when Greg Zuerlein kicked a 48-yard field goal to make it 17–7.  The Niners came within 4 with two field goals of their own kicked by Robbie Gould from 36 and 48 yards out to make the score 17-10 and then 17–13.  Gurley then put the Rams up by double digits at halftime when he ran for a 2-yard touchdown to make it 24–13.  In the third quarter Zuerlein kicked a 19-yard field goal to make it 27-13 Rams.  The Niners then came within a touchdown when Carlos Hyde ran for one from a yard out.  The Rams moved up by 2 touchdowns again when Goff found Sammy Watkins on a 1-yard pass to make it 34–20.  In the fourth quarter, the Niners came within 8 when Garrett Celek caught a 1-yard pass from Hoyer (with a failed PAT) to make it 34–26.  The Rams again moved up by double digits when Goff and Watkins connected again on a 13-yard pass to make it 41–26.  Finally, the Niners were able to come within two points with two more touchdowns:  Trent Taylor caught a pass from Hoyer 3 yards out to make it 41-33 and Hyde ran for another 1-yard touchdown (with a failed 2-point conversion) to make the final score 41–39.

With the loss, the Niners fell to 0–3.

Week 4: at Arizona Cardinals

Week 5: at Indianapolis Colts

Week 6: at Washington Redskins

With the loss, the 49ers fell to 0–6. With the Giants defeating the Broncos on Sunday Night Football, they became the last winless team in the NFC.

Week 7: vs. Dallas Cowboys

Week 8: at Philadelphia Eagles

With this loss, the 49ers secured their fourth consecutive non-winning season.

Week 9: vs. Arizona Cardinals

Week 10: vs. New York Giants

After starting the season 0–9, which was never recorded in team history, the Niners left the Cleveland Browns the only winless team in the NFL for 2017. This game also ended the possibility of the Niners becoming the second NFL team to go 0–16.

Week 12: vs. Seattle Seahawks

Week 13: at Chicago Bears

This was Jimmy Garoppolo's first start as a 49ers quarterback.

Week 14: at Houston Texans

For the first time in 8 years, head coach Kyle Shanahan made his first return to Houston since leaving the Texans in 2010 to become the offensive coordinator for the Washington Redskins under his father, head coach Mike Shanahan. Kyle previously served as Houston's wide receivers coach in 2006, quarterbacks coach in 2007, and the offensive coordinator from 2008–2009 under then-head coach Gary Kubiak.

Week 15: vs. Tennessee Titans

Week 16: vs. Jacksonville Jaguars

Week 17: at Los Angeles Rams

With the win, the Niners finished their season 6–10. Jimmy Garoppolo became the first NFL quarterback to go 7–0 in his first seven starts since Ben Roethlisberger in 2004.

Standings

Division

Conference

References

External links

 
 

San Francisco
San Francisco 49ers seasons
San Francisco 49ers
2017 in San Francisco